Williamson v. Lee Optical Co., 348 U.S. 483 (1955), was a case in which the Supreme Court of the United States held that state laws regulating business are subject to only rational basis review and that the Court need not contemplate all possible reasons for legislation.

Background
The optician plaintiff brought suit to have a 1953 Oklahoma law declared unconstitutional and to enjoin state officials from enforcing it. The law at issue (59 Okla. Stat. Ann. §§ 941–947, Okla. Laws 1953, c. 13, §§ 2–8) contained provisions making it unlawful for any person not a licensed optometrist or ophthalmologist to fit lenses to a face or to duplicate or replace into frames lenses or other optical appliances, except upon written prescriptive authority of an Oklahoma licensed ophthalmologist or optometrist. The law required every individual seeking to have eyeglasses made, repaired, or refitted to obtain a prescription. The law had a practical negative effect on unlicensed opticians, but it exempted sellers of ready-to-wear eyeglasses. It was thus challenged on equal protection grounds as well as on due process grounds for arbitrary interference with an optician's right to do business.

The District Court ruled that portions of §§ 2, 3, and 4 of the Act violated the Due Process Clause of the Fourteenth Amendment to the Constitution and that portions of § 3 of the Act violated the Equal Protection Clause of the Fourteenth Amendment to the Constitution.

Decision
The Court affirmed in part and reversed in part holding, among other things, that the law's provisions did not violate the Due Process clause of the Fourteenth Amendment. It also held that the burdened effect on opticians while sellers of ready-to-wear eyeglasses were exempted did not violate the Equal Protection clause.

Using rational basis review, the Court found that the Oklahoma State Legislature had a legitimate interest in requiring a prescription from a licensed optometrist or ophthalmologist. Although opticians were qualified to refit lenses without prescriptions, the Court reasoned that requiring prescriptions in every case would encourage more frequent eye examinations, which may enable early detection of more serious eye conditions. Consequently, if a legitimate governmental interest lies, as reasoned by the Court, the law can survive a Due Process challenge.

The Court further held that there was no Equal Protection violation because legislatures were permitted to deal with problems "one step at a time, addressing itself to the phase of the problem which seems most acute to the legislative mind." Thus, that opticians were so impacted while sellers of ready-to-wear glasses were exempted may have been a signal that the sellers did not represent a portion of the problem that loomed large in the legislature's mind.

Justice Douglas, writing for the Court, articulated the standard for determining whether the law survives a Due Process challenge: "the law need not be in every respect logically consistent with its aims to be constitutional. It is enough that there is an evil at hand for correction, and that it might be thought that the particular legislative measure was a rational way to correct it."

According to Justice Douglas, "The day is gone when this court uses the Due Process Clause of the Fourteenth Amendment to strike down state laws, regulatory of business and industrial conditions, because they may be unwise, improvident, or out of harmony with a particular school of thought."

The Court summarily addresses the Equal Protection issue in this case: "The prohibition of the Equal Protection Clause goes no further than invidious discrimination. We cannot say that this point has been reached here.”

See also
List of United States Supreme Court cases, volume 348

External links

1955 in United States case law
United States Supreme Court cases
United States Supreme Court cases of the Warren Court
United States substantive due process case law
Optometry
Healthcare in Oklahoma